Woodside is a town in Kent County, Delaware, United States. It is part of the Dover, Delaware Metropolitan Statistical Area. The population was 181 at the 2010 census.

History
Woodside was originally named the "Village of Fredonia" and underwent a name change to Woodside that was passed by the Delaware General Assembly on March 17, 1869. Woodside developed as a shipping center for fruit and grain after the Delaware Railroad was built in 1856. The Woodside Methodist Episcopal Church was listed on the National Register of Historic Places in 1996.

Geography
Woodside is located at  (39.0715017, –75.5682584).

Infrastructure

Transportation

U.S. Route 13 Alternate passes north–south through Woodside on Upper King Road, heading south to Canterbury and north to Camden. Delaware Route 10 Alternate passes east–west through Woodside on Main Street. Delaware Route 15 passes through Woodside by heading north along US 13 Alternate and west along DE 10 Alternate before heading north along Dundee Road. U.S. Route 13 passes to the east of Woodside along Dupont Highway, heading north toward Dover and south toward Harrington. DART First State provides bus service to the Woodside area along Route 117, which heads north toward Camden to connect to the local bus routes serving the Dover area and south toward Harrington. The Delmarva Central Railroad's Delmarva Secondary line passes north–south through Woodside.

Utilities
Delmarva Power, a subsidiary of Exelon, provides electricity to Woodside. Chesapeake Utilities provides natural gas to the town.

Education
Woodside is located in the Caesar Rodney School District. Students are zoned to Nellie Hughes Stokes Elementary School in Camden, and in turn are zoned to Fred Fifer III Middle School in Camden. Caesar Rodney High School in Camden is the comprehensive high school for the entire district.

Demographics

At the 2000 census there were 184 people, 70 households, and 52 families living in the town. The racial makeup of the town was 96.20% White, 0.54% African American, 1.09% Asian, 0.54% from other races, and 1.63% from two or more races. Hispanic or Latino of any race were 1.09%.

Of the 70 households 31.4% had children under the age of 18 living with them, 61.4% were married couples living together, 11.4% had a female householder with no husband present, and 25.7% were non-families. 20.0% of households were one person and 12.9% were one person aged 65 or older.  The average household size was 2.63 and the average family size was 2.94.

The age distribution was 22.3% under the age of 18, 6.5% from 18 to 24, 33.7% from 25 to 44, 25.0% from 45 to 64, and 12.5% 65 or older.  The median age was 39 years. For every 100 females, there were 87.8 males.  For every 100 females age 18 and over, there were 81.0 males.

The median household income was $54,250 and the median family income  was $53,750. Males had a median income of $35,417 versus $21,875 for females. The per capita income for the town was $23,399.  About 3.9% of families and 7.9% of the population were below the poverty line, including none of those under the age of eighteen and 15.0% of those sixty five or over.

References

Towns in Kent County, Delaware
Towns in Delaware